Tiffield was a short-lived experimental railway station situated at the highest point of the Stratford-upon-Avon and Midland Junction Railway which opened in 1869 to serve the Northamptonshire village of Tiffield, only to close two years later.

History 
An experimental passenger station was opened at Tiffield Summit, the highest point of the line, in October 1869. It consisted of little more than a timber landing stage and saw regular passenger services only until February 1871, although special services on Towcester racedays may have called at the station up to around 1908. The location of the station did not make it popular with the locomotive crew as up trains would have had a great deal of difficulty in making a standing start on such a steep uphill gradient.

Present day 
The station site, which used to teem with rabbits hunted by at least one locomotive driver, now forms part of the Tiffield Pocket Park, a 1 km section of the trackbed which was purchased by local businessman John Mawby as a wildlife refuge after the line's closure and leased to Tiffield Parish Council in 2001 for 25 years.

References

Disused railway stations in Northamptonshire
Former Stratford-upon-Avon and Midland Junction Railway stations
Railway stations in Great Britain opened in 1869
Railway stations in Great Britain closed in 1871
1869 establishments in England
West Northamptonshire District